The Substitute is a 2015 short film written by Madeleine Sims-Fewer and directed by Nathan Hughes-Berry. The film is inspired by Sims-Fewer's experience of life at boarding school and was shot on location at St Angela's Ursuline Catholic School in East London.

The film made its UK premiere at London Short Film Festival and has gone on to pick up nominations at Fantasporto, Imagine Amsterdam Fantastic Film Festival where it competed for the Silver Melies, Dresden Filmfest where it competed for the Golden Horseman and Bucheon International Fantastic Film Festival. The film was chosen to screen at the Cannes Film Festival as part of Telefilm Canada's Not Short on Talent programme.

Synopsis 

A young teacher takes a job at an unusual private school where she soon discovers that the boys have a sinister power over the girls. As the boys behaviour becomes increasingly threatening she uncovers the source of the girls fear; an ominous locked door at the back of the classroom.

Awards
 Best Short Screenplay (Second Place) - Slamdance Screenplay Competition
 Best Screenplay - Canadian Film Fest
 Best Short Drama (Winner) - The Smalls Film Festival
 Best Short Film/Screenplay/Director - Little Rock Fantastic Cinema
 Best Short Film - Nitehawk Shorts Festival
 Best Short Film - Waves of Horror Film Festival
 Best Supporting Actor - British Horror Film Festival
 Honorable Mention - Brno16 Film Festival
 Special Mention - Corto Helvetico Al Femminile

References

External links
 

2015 films
2015 short films
Canadian horror short films
American horror short films
2010s English-language films
2010s Canadian films
2010s American films